Dalby was an electoral district of the Legislative Assembly in the Australian state of Queensland. It existed from 1873 to 1949 and centred on the town of Dalby.

Members for Dalby

Election results

See also
 Electoral districts of Queensland
 Members of the Queensland Legislative Assembly by year
 :Category:Members of the Queensland Legislative Assembly by name

References

Darling Downs
Former electoral districts of Queensland
Constituencies established in 1873
Constituencies disestablished in 1949
1873 establishments in Australia
1949 disestablishments in Australia